Todd Herbert Bol (January 2, 1956 – October 18, 2018) was the creator and founder of Little Free Library, a global public bookcase nonprofit organization. In 2009, he used wood from his old garage door to make the first library-on-a-stick as a tribute to his mother, while living in Hudson, Wisconsin. As of 2016, the project has expanded to include Little Free Libraries in 85 countries.  According to a 2018 article, there are now more than 75,000 Little Free Libraries in 88 countries.

During Bol's career, he founded an international trade company; Global Scholarship Alliance, which provides nursing scholarships for advanced nursing;  and Care Forth, Inc., an entrepreneurial consulting firm. Prior to these ventures, he worked as a public school teacher for five years in Circle Pines and Cambridge, Minnesota.

Bol died from pancreatic cancer in 2018 at the age of 62.

References

External links

Businesspeople from Minnesota
1956 births
2018 deaths
People from North St. Paul, Minnesota
University of Wisconsin–River Falls alumni
Deaths from cancer in Wisconsin
Deaths from pancreatic cancer
20th-century American businesspeople